Schrevelius is a Latinized Dutch name that means scrivener.

The following writers were called Schrevelius:

 Theodorus Schrevelius, 1572–1649, humanist and rector of the Stedelijk Gymnasium Haarlem and the Latin school in Leiden
 His son Cornelis Schrevel, 1608–1661, linguist and rector of the Latin school in Leiden

Dutch writers